Radinac is a village in the municipality of Smederevo, Serbia. According to the 2011 census, the village has a population of 5,428 people. It is home to Serbia's only operating steel mill - Železara Smederevo, previously known as Sartid,

See also
Populated places of Serbia
Železara Smederevo

References

Populated places in Podunavlje District